Eric Gordon (born November 17, 1967) is an American professional race car driver. Gordon raced primarily in the United States Auto Club (USAC) open wheel sprint cars and Silver Crown cars. He finished second in both USAC Sprint and Silver Crown championships in the 1980s and 1990s. Gordon made one NASCAR Busch Series start at Indianapolis Raceway Park. He most recently raced for the full 2021 Silver Crown championship season in the No. 99 car for Brad & Tara Armstrong.

Racing career

Open wheel
Gordon has finished second in the United States Auto Club (USAC) Sprint car points three times (1989, 1990, 1998) and second in the USAC Silver Crown series once (1990). Gordon won the Little 500 Sprint car race at Anderson Speedway a record nine times in 22 starts. Gordon retired from racing and helped his son to do racing. He didn't race Silver Crown cars from 2012 until resuming in 2018. As of the start of the 2022 season, he has won 13 total USAC Sprint car features. 

He also has an Indy Lights start.

Stock car
He made one NASCAR Busch Series start at Indianapolis Raceway Park in 1993. He has not attempted another NASCAR race since.

Legacy
He was inducted in the National Sprint Car Hall of Fame in 2022.

Motorsports career results

NASCAR
(key) (Bold – Pole position awarded by qualifying time. Italics – Pole position earned by points standings or practice time. * – Most laps led.)

Busch Series

References

External links
 

1967 births
NASCAR drivers
Living people
Racing drivers from Indianapolis
USAC Silver Crown Series drivers
World of Outlaws drivers